Storskogen is a district in Sundbyberg Municipality with 3062 inhabitants (in 2019), and a suburb in the Stockholm metropolitan area. It is located between Central Sundbyberg and the Solna Municipality district Råsunda. The metro station Näckrosen has an exit here. The area was a mix of forest and meadows until the 1950s, when the current residential area was built there.

Gallery

References

Stockholm urban area
Populated places in Sundbyberg Municipality